Norwich City School District is a school district in Norwich, New York, United States. The current superintendent is Mr. Scott Ryan.

The district operates four schools: Norwich High School, Norwich Middle School, Perry Brown Intermediate School, and Stanford Gibson Primary School.

Administration 
The District offices are located 89 Midland Drive. The current Superintendent is Mr. Scott Ryan.

Administrators 
Scott Ryan–Superintendent
Jessica Poyer–Director of Teaching, Learning & Personnel
Michael Taylor–CARE Coordinator
Brian Bartlett–Director of Business Services & Transportation
Rafael Olazagasti–Director of Human Resources

Board of Education 
Christopher Olds–President
Brian Reid–Vice President
Brian Burton
Roz DeRensis
Kiernan Hamilton
Debra Phelps
Clyde Birch, Jr.
Lauren Van Beers–District Clerk
Pamela Salvati–Assistant District Clerk

Selected Former Superintendents 
Mr. Albert S. Brown
Dr. Robert L. Cleveland–2004-2005
Mr. William H. Kennedy–?-2004

Norwich High School 

Norwich High School is located at 89 Midland Drive and serves grades 9 through 12. The current principal is The current principal  is Scott Graham.

History

Selected former principals 
Mr. James B. Waters (Principal - Bainbridge-Guilford Junior/Senior High School, retired)
Mr. John Ross–2001-2006
Mr. Thomas Knapp–2006-2008
Dr. Robert Cleveland

Selected former assistant principals
Previous assignment and reason for departure denoted in parentheses
Mr. Scott Ryan (unknown, named Principal of Norwich Middle School)

Norwich Middle School 

Norwich Middle School is located at 89 Midland Drive and serves grades 6 through 8. The current principal is Terence Devine.

History

Selected former principals 
Previous assignment and reason for departure denoted in parentheses
Mr. Joseph Gutosky
Ms. Kathryn Knapp–?-2004
Mr. Edward Peters–2004-2005
Ms. Lisa Schuchman (unknown, named Principal of Norwich High School)

Selected former assistant principals 
Previous assignment and reason for departure denoted in parentheses
Ms. Patricia Giltner (unknown, named Vice Principal of Norwich High School)

Perry Browne Elementary School 

Perry Browne Intermediate School is located at 31 Beebe Avenue and serves grades 3 through 5. The current acting principal is Sara Gilbeau.

History

Selected former principals 
Mr. Russell Perlman
Mr. Lelan G. Brookins–?-2004
Ms. Michelle Donlon–2004-2007
Ms. Heather Collier–2007-2009

Stanford J. Gibson Elementary School 

Stanford J. Gibson Primary School is located at 7 Ridgeland Road and serves grades K through 2. The current principal is Jennifer Oliver.

References

External links

School districts in New York (state)
Education in Chenango County, New York